Allen Falkner (born April 17, 1969) is founder of TSD, the first suspension group. He is often referred to as the Father of Modern Suspension and is considered the first to bring body suspension to the mainstream.

Falkner is also professional body piercer with a long and established history (he was one of the first apprentices of Fakir Musafar), as well as a multi-faceted body artist.

He was hired to help realize the body suspension stunt of Criss Angel for his TV show Mindfreak in which he was suspended in suicide position from a helicopter flying over the mountains in the Valley of Fire.

He also appeared in the movie Modify.

References

External links
 Website:allenfalkner.com
 Suspension Website:suspension.org 
 Audio interview with Allen from 2000 in the BME/radio archives.
 2006 article featuring Mr Falkner: Associated Press
 Article about Mr Falkner from 2007: San Francisco Chronicle
 Article about Mr Falkner from 2008: BMEzine.com

1969 births
Living people
Body piercers
American company founders